Monolithic Power Systems, Inc. is an American, publicly traded company headquartered in Kirkland, Washington. It operates in more than 15+ locations worldwide.

Monolithic Power Systems (MPS) provides power circuits for systems found in cloud computing, telecom infrastructures, automotive, industrial applications and consumer applications.

History 
Monolithic Power Systems, Inc. was founded in 1997 by Michael Hsing, who is the current CEO. Prior to the founding of the corporation, Hsing worked as a Senior Silicon Technology Developer at several analog integrated circuit companies.

The company then diversified into DC/DC products. In November 2004, Hsing took the company public with an IPO. Since then, the company has grown to incorporate 6 product lines with more than 1,000 products.

In February 2021, the company was added to the S&P 500. Monolithic Power Systems recently appointed a female board member.

About 
Monolithic Power Systems is headquartered in Kirkland, Washington, and has manufacturing houses in Los Gatos, California and Taipei, Taiwan. The company designs, develops, and markets for communications, storage and computing, consumer electronics, industrial, and automotive markets. Monolithic Power Systems markets its products through third-party distributors and value-added resellers. It directly markets to original equipment manufacturers, original design manufacturers, and electronic manufacturing service providers  in China, Taiwan, Europe, Korea, Southeast Asia, Japan, and the United States.

Products 

Monolithic Power Systems provides digital, analog, and mixed-signal integrated circuits. It offers DC to DC converter ICs that are used to convert and control voltages of various electronic systems, such as portable electronic devices, wireless LAN access points, computers, set top boxes, displays, automobiles, and medical equipment. The company also provides lighting control ICs for backlighting, which are used in systems that provide the light source for LCD panels in notebook computers, LCD monitors, car navigation systems, and LCD televisions. In addition, Monolithic Power Systems manufactures class D Audio Amplifier products.

Locations 
Monolithic Power Systems operates at 18 locations primarily in US, Europe, and east Asia.

References

External links 

Companies based in Kirkland, Washington
Companies listed on the Nasdaq
American companies established in 1997
Technology companies established in 1997
2004 initial public offerings